Silver Lake State Park is a  state park in Barnard, Vermont. It is situated on the northern shoreline of the 84-acre Silver Lake and offers swimming, picnic areas and camping. Other activities include fishing, paddling and winter sports.

The park was established in 1955 and is administered by the Vermont Department of Forests, Parks, and Recreation as part of the Vermont state park system.

References

External links
 

1955 establishments in Vermont
Barnard, Vermont
Protected areas established in 1955
Protected areas of Windsor County, Vermont
State parks of Vermont